Sugar Creek is a stream in the U.S. state of West Virginia. It is a tributary to Laurel Creek.

Sugar Creek was named for the sugar maple trees which grow near its course.

References

Rivers of West Virginia
Rivers of Barbour County, West Virginia